Beharena is a commune in Atsimo-Atsinanana Region in south-eastern Madagascar.

Following 6 villages belong to the commune:
Akira
Ankarapotsy
Beharena
Efasy
Ianakody
Mahabo

References

Populated places in Atsimo-Atsinanana